The electoral division of Windermere is one of the 15 electorates or 'seats' in the Tasmanian Legislative Council. The division is located on the East side of the Tamar River. It is named after the town of Windermere which is located along the banks of the river between Launceston and George Town.

Within the electorate are the towns of George Town, Low Head, Windermere, Dilston, Relbia, Hillwood and Bell Bay. The Launceston suburbs of Rocherlea, Newnham, Mowbray, Mayfield, Ravenswood, St Leonards, Elphin and Waverley.

The voting population in keeping with other divisional boundaries is approximately 26,000 voters. The current sitting member is Liberal Nick Duigan. The boundaries of Windermere were determined by a redistribution which occurred in 2017.

Members

See also

 Tasmanian House of Assembly

References

External links
Parliament of Tasmania
Tasmanian Electoral Commission - Legislative Council

External links
Maps of Tasmanian Divisions in the Legislative Council since the 1999 redistribution.
Tasmanian parliament website

Windermere
Northern Tasmania